Raja straeleni, the biscuit skate or spotted skate, is a species of marine fish in the skate family (family Rajidae) of order Rajiformes. It is native to the eastern Atlantic Ocean.

Distribution
Eastern Atlantic: Rio de Oro, Western Sahara to South Africa.

Description 
A skate with a blunt, angular snout, a long, thick tail, and a broad flattened angular disc with wing-like pectoral fins. There are thorns on upper surface of disc and tail, and sometimes also on the underside of large individuals. Colour is brown to grey dorsally, with small to large black spots, whorls and blotches, and a larger eyespot at each pectoral fin base. The underside is plain white. Juveniles lack the dark dorsal spots.
Attains 68 cm width.

Habitat and behaviour
Oceanodromous marine demersal. Depth range shore to 800 m, usually 100 – 300 m but sometimes seen much shallower. Sandy or muddy bottoms. 
Found in shallow enclosed bays and on the continental slope. Feeds on invertebrates, bony fishes and fish offal. Oviparous: Eggs cases are dark brown and have horn-like projections on the shell. Migrates towards the coastal shallows during the warm season and towards deep waters in winter.

Importance to humans 
Commercial and gamefish. Caught by shore and ski-boat anglers and by hake trawlers. Pectoral fins sold as 'skate wings' .

Name
Etymology: Raja: Latin, raja, -ae = a sting ray;  straeleni: Named after V. Van Straelen, director of IRSNB, Belgium.

Common names: Biscuit skate, False thornback skate, spotted skate.

References

External links 
 

straeleni
Fish of the East Atlantic
Marine fish of Africa
Fish described in 1951